The Baptist Union of Trinidad and Tobago is a Baptist Christian denomination in Trinidad and Tobago. It is affiliated with the Baptist World Alliance. The headquarters is in Princes Town.

History
The Baptist Union of Trinidad and Tobago has its origins in the first Baptist church founded in 1816 by freed slaves from United States.  It is officially founded in 1854.  According to a denomination census released in 2020, it claimed 24 churches and 3,948 members.

References

Baptist denominations in the Caribbean
Evangelicalism in Trinidad and Tobago